Eduardo Olivera (born 17 July 1945) is a Mexican modern pentathlete. He competed at the 1968 and 1972 Summer Olympics.

References

1945 births
Living people
Mexican male modern pentathletes
Olympic modern pentathletes of Mexico
Modern pentathletes at the 1968 Summer Olympics
Modern pentathletes at the 1972 Summer Olympics
Sportspeople from Mexico City
20th-century Mexican people